The Battle of Bar took place on October 7, 1042 between the army of Stefan Vojislav, the Serbian ruler of Duklja, and Byzantine forces led by Michaelus Anastasii. The battle was actually a sudden attack on the Byzantine camp in the mountain gorge, which ended in the utter defeat of the Byzantine forces and the deaths of 7 of their commanders (strategoi). Following the defeat and retreat of the Byzantines, Vojislav ensured a future for Duklja without imperial authority, and Duklja would soon emerge as the most significant Serb state.

In memory of this victory, 7 October is commemorated as the day of the Military of Montenegro.

Background
Prior to the war, Duklja and the other principalities were subordinated to the suzerainty of the Byzantine Empire. However, around the start of the 11th century, Stefan Vojislav waged a series of successful attacks aimed at independence.

The Byzantine army, led by the dux Michael, moved towards Duklja in order to suppress the revolts, and they set up camp in the area near Bar. Byzantine historian John Skylitzes described their invasion of Duklja (in Latin translation by Immanuel Bekker):

Battle

The battle took place in the mountainous area between Bar and Crmnica after midnight, on October 7, 1042. Prior to the battle a man from Bar entered the Byzantine camp and spread false information about a huge army, causing panic among the Byzantines. Stefan Vojislav, along with three of his sons, led the Serbs into battle. Their army slowly moved down the hills along with shouting and blowing horns and trumpets to exaggerate their size. The Byzantines, trapped in the mountainous area, were caught unprepared and after heavy fighting were routed. Some historical records say that two thirds of the Byzantine army were killed. Byzantine historian John Skylitzes (1040–1101) said that 60,000 Byzantines participated in the battle, but these records are considered inaccurate. Most historians agree that there were about 40,000 Byzantines. Serbs numbers are unknown, but are considered to be greatly inferior to the Byzantines. Vojislav dispatched 50 Greeks to spread the news about it. The Strategikon described the outcome of the battle:

References 

Vojislavljević dynasty
Bar, Montenegro
Medieval Montenegro
1042 in Europe
Bar
Bar
Battles involving the Byzantine Empire

Sources